Moses of Kyiv may refer to:

 Moses of Kiev, a twelfth-century Jewish Talmudist
 Moses (Kulik) (born 1962), a patriarch of the Ukrainian Autocephalous Orthodox Church Canonical